The Cerro Dragón Oil Field is an oil field located in Chubut Province. It was discovered in 1958 and developed by BP. The oil field is operated and owned by BP.

References 

Oil fields in Argentina